Himmat Singh Shergill is an Indian politician and lawyer. He belongs to the Aam Aadmi Party.

He attended Lawrence School Sanawar, then moved to the United Kingdom to pursue a law degree. He ran for election in 2014 and 2017, but was unsuccessful. He worked as a lawyer for the Aam Aadmi Party from 2014 to 2017 before leaving politics to focus on his law career.

Political Career

Himmat Singh Shergill unsuccessfully contested his first election from Shri Anandpur Sahib Lok Sabha constituency in 2014.[5] He secured 28.15% votes. He also unsuccessfully contested 2017 vidhan sabha elections from Majitha. He was Head of Legal Cell of Aam Aadmi Party from 2014 to 2017. He has been inactive in Politics since 2017 and is practising Law ever since.

References

Indian lawyers
Living people
Aam Aadmi Party politicians from Punjab, India
Alumni of the University of Buckingham
Alumni of City, University of London
Members of the Inner Temple
Year of birth missing (living people)